Argentala brehmi is a moth of the family Notodontidae first described by James S. Miller in 2008. It is endemic to the eastern slope of the Andes.

The length of the forewings is 13.5–14.5 mm for males and 15 mm for females. The ground color of the forewings is dark chocolate brown and the ground color of the hindwings is dark charcoal gray to blackish brown, with a white basal area of the ventral surface showing faintly through.

Etymology
The species is named in honor of Gunnar Brehm who captured the holotype and one of the three paratypes.

References

Moths described in 2008
Notodontidae of South America